Keyesport Landing is an unincorporated community in Bond County, Illinois, United States. Keyesport Landing is located on the western shore of Carlyle Lake north of Keyesport.

References

Unincorporated communities in Bond County, Illinois
Unincorporated communities in Illinois